Madina Zhanatayeva (born 3 May 1991) is a Kazakhstani women's football midfielder currently playing for BIIK Kazygurt.

External links 
 

1991 births
Living people
Kazakhstani women's footballers
Kazakhstan women's international footballers
Women's association football midfielders
BIIK Kazygurt players
Kubanochka Krasnodar players